Moats is an unincorporated community in Defiance County, in the U.S. state of Ohio.

A post office called Moats was established in 1889, and remained in operation until 1905. Little remains of the original community.

References

Unincorporated communities in Defiance County, Ohio
Unincorporated communities in Ohio